The Epitaph of Samuel is an Ancient Greek limestone tombstone slab epitaph inscription which was discovered in 1934, in the monastic cemetery of the Byzantine period, at the YMCA area in Jerusalem.

The inscription mentions "Iberian [i.e. Georgian] bishop, Samuel" and the purchase of a tomb or a monastery in the area of Tower of David. Because of the incorrect Greek, it is unclear if the Iberians bought a tomb or a monastery. It is assumed the church belonged to the Iberian clergy and possibly served the whole Georgian monastic community of Jerusalem. It may have been a cemeterial church, extremely rare in Palestine of Byzantine period, and completely absent in ancient Georgia. The slab is partly broken and the whole right corner of it is lost. It is dated to the late 5th or early 6th century AD. The inscription is kept at Rockefeller Museum.

Inscription
ΝΗΜΑΔΙΑΦΡΣΑΜ
ΠΙΣΚΟΠΟΥΙΒΕΡΩ
ΚΤΗΣΜΟΝΗΣΑΥΤΟΥΟΗΓ
ΡΑΣΑΝΕΝΤΩΠΥΡΓΩΔΑΔ
Translation: Tomb belonging to Samuel, bishop of the Iberians, and to his monastery, which they bought in the area of Tower of David.

See also
Bir el Qutt inscriptions
Umm Leisun inscription
Georgian graffiti of Nazareth and Sinai

References

Bibliography
Di Segni, L. & Tsafrir, Y. (2012) The Ethnic Composition of Jerusalem’s Population in the Byzantine Period (312-638 CE)
Corpus Inscriptionum Iudaeae/Palaestinae (CIIP) (2012) Jerusalem, Part 2: 705-1120, by Hannah Cotton, Werner Eck, Benjamin Isaac etc. Walter de Gruyter
Tchekhanovets, Y. (2014) Iohane, Bishop of Purtavi and Caucasian Albanians in the Holy Land
Tchekhanovets, Y. (2018) The Caucasian Archaeology of the Holy Land: Armenian, Georgian and Albanian communities between the fourth and eleventh centuries CE, Brill Publishers
Tchekhanovets, Y. (2017) The 1930s excavations at the YMCA site in Jerusalem and the Byzantine 'Monastery of the Iberians', Liber Annuus 67

Greek inscriptions
Archaeological artifacts
5th-century inscriptions
6th-century inscriptions
5th century in the Byzantine Empire
6th century in the Byzantine Empire
Classical sites in Jerusalem
1934 archaeological discoveries